Modern Ranch Living is a 2004 novel by Mark Poirier and was published by Miramax Books.

Plot
The novel concerns the connection between a pair of very different loners during a hot summer in Arizona.

References

2004 American novels
Novels by Mark Poirier
Novels set in Arizona
English-language novels